Fulton Street may refer to:

Places

Chicago
Fulton-Randolph Market District
Fulton River District

New York City
In New York City, the name is frequently associated with Robert Fulton, who invented a steam boat.

Street names
 Fulton Street (Brooklyn)
 Fulton Street (Manhattan)

New York City Subway
Fulton Center (formerly Fulton Street Transit Center)
Fulton Street station (BMT Fifth Avenue Line); a station on the demolished section of the BMT Fifth Avenue Line in Brooklyn
Fulton Street station (IND Crosstown Line); in Brooklyn serving the  train
Fulton Street station (IRT Third Avenue Line); a station on the demolished section of the IRT Third Avenue Line in Manhattan
Fulton Street station (New York City Subway), a station complex in Manhattan serving the  trains; consisting of:
Fulton Street (BMT Nassau Street Line); serving the  trains
Fulton Street (IND Eighth Avenue Line); serving the  trains
Fulton Street (IRT Broadway – Seventh Avenue Line); serving the  trains
Fulton Street (IRT Lexington Avenue Line); serving the  trains
 IND Eighth Avenue Line, running under Fulton Street in Manhattan
 IND Fulton Street Line, running under Fulton Street in Brooklyn

Other uses
 2400 Fulton Street, a 1987 Jefferson Airplane compilation album
 Fulton Street I and Fulton Street II, songs from La Dispute's 2019 album Panorama

See also
 Fulton Street Line (disambiguation)